The Fly-Fan Shark is a Slovak light aircraft designed by Frantisek Sustek and initially developed by Fly-Fan of Trenčín. Development continues under the new owner of the design, AENEA Services. The design was introduced at the AERO Friedrichshafen show in 2007 as a mock up and in 2011 as a flying aircraft. The aircraft first flew on 29 June 2011 and is intended to be supplied as a complete ready-to-fly-aircraft.

Design and development
The Shark was designed with the goal of providing similar performance to other twin-engined light aircraft, but on 30% less power. It features a cantilever low-wing, a five-seat enclosed cabin, retractable tricycle landing gear and twin wing-mounted engines in tractor configuration.

The aircraft is made from Kevlar and carbon fibre. Its  span wing employs a Jd 16 (40) 162 airfoil at the wing root, transitioning to a Jd 17 (40) 157 at mid-span and a Jd 15 (35) 136 at the wing tip. The standard engines fitted are a pair of  Lycoming O-320-D1A four-stroke powerplants.

Specifications (Shark)

References

External links

Low-wing aircraft
2010s Slovak civil aircraft
Twin piston-engined tractor aircraft
Aircraft first flown in 2011